Michael Ouweleen (born 1967) is an American television executive and screenwriter. He is the current president of The Cartoon Network, Inc., the operating company of Cartoon Network (which includes the Cartoonito and ACME Night blocks), Adult Swim (which includes the Toonami block), and Boomerang. Previously, he was best known as a creative, co-creating the animated television series Harvey Birdman, Attorney at Law and the show's spin-off, Birdgirl, and is the executive producer of the television film Re-Animated. He was a long-time creative director at Cartoon Network since 1996, and ran content development and oversaw programming for the network in the mid-2000s. Ouweleen is married with three sons.

In 2014, Ouweleen was named CMO of CNI. He was then promoted in January 2020 as the interim president of CNI in addition to Turner Classic Movies, due to the departure of Christina Miller. His stint as interim president of CNI ended on July 1, 2020 with the appointment of Tom Ascheim permanently to the position, and Ouweleen took the presidency of Adult Swim. 

In May 2022, following the Warner Bros. Discovery merger close, Tom Ascheim departed CNI, and the companies under CNI (Cartoon Network, Adult Swim, and Boomerang) were moved into Warner Bros. Discovery Networks U.S., with Ouweleen regaining oversight of CNI after one year and ten months. He has also gained the role of president for Discovery Family.

See also
List of Harvey Birdman, Attorney at Law episodes

References

External links
 

Living people
1968 births
21st-century American businesspeople
American television writers
American male television writers
Cartoon Network executives
Cartoon Network Studios people